Ray's Candy Store is a deli at 113 Avenue A in the East Village neighborhood of Manhattan in New York City. The store has been in business since 1974.

It is operated by Ray Alvarez and serves an eclectic mix of foods, including egg creams, soft serve ice cream, frozen yogurt, New Orleans style beignets, Belgian fries, and coffee. The store has been featured in several books, films, and television shows. It's also become famous for its annual Birthday Burlesque Extravaganza, an invite-only surprise birthday party held in honor of the proprietor.

History
Alvarez was born on January 1, 1933, in Iran and moved to New York in 1964, where he worked for another decade as a dishwasher in New York until he paid $30,000 for the candy store in 1974.

On the evening of August 6, 1988, what became known as the Tompkins Square Park Riot broke out between police and a group of protestors rallying against a recently enacted curfew on the park. Ray's Candy Store, across from the entrance to the park, remained open during the riot that ensued. Ray said he stayed open "because all the combatants were his customers."

On the morning of June 19, 1992, vigilante, founder and CEO of the Guardian Angels, and radio talk show host and media personality, Curtis Sliwa, was kidnapped and shot by two gunmen after entering a stolen taxi outside Ray's Candy Store.

In early 2010, Ray's Candy Store fell behind on its rent and faced eviction by its landlord. The business was the subject of much press as a result. In a broad show of support, friends, neighbors, customers, and other community members quickly rushed to Ray's aid, hosting various fundraisers and starting a social media campaign meant to boost the beloved business's profile.

In July 2011, after a decades-long process, proprietor Ray, whose real name is Asghar Ghahraman, became a naturalized U.S. citizen at a ceremony held at 26 Federal Plaza in lower Manhattan. Years earlier, he had jumped ship from the Iranian Navy, but anxiety about his status as an illegal immigrant led him to adopt a new identity in his new home — as a Puerto Rican named Ray Alvarez. Asghar-turned-Ray eventually received amnesty under President Reagan — but, in a twist of fate, his green card was mailed to the wrong address, and he remained stuck in legal limbo. Without proper documentation, he faced an uphill road to naturalization. With the help of friends who assisted him with paperwork, Ray, 78 at the time, was finally able to qualify to become an American.

New York photographer Robert "Bob" Arihood often staked out a spot in front of Ray's Candy store taking pictures of the comings and going around the store and often portrayed Ray and his store on his blog, Neither more nor less.  After Arihood's death in October 2011, he was temporarily memorialized on the sign of Ray's Candy Store.

In August 2015, Ray's Candy Store was selected as the Greenwich Village Society for Historic Preservation's "Business of the Month."

In November 2016, Ray's Candy Store won "Best Restaurant" in the East Village in the inaugural Time Out New York Love New York Awards.

In 2020, Ray's Candy Store was awarded a "Village Award" by the Greenwich Village Society for Historic Preservation. The awards recognize those people, places, and organizations that make a significant contribution to the quality of life in Greenwich Village, the East Village, and NoHo."

Ray's Annual Birthday Burlesque Extravaganza
Beginning in 2007, some friends and employees of Ray's have thrown him an annual birthday party at the store, typically featuring a lineup of local burlesque dancers. The invite-only surprise party is often chronicled by local media and is cheekily referred to by the store's staff as "THE BEST TRADITION IN NEW YORK CITY™."

Appearances in media

Film

In the 1993 film drama What About Me, two actors approach the exterior to-go window of Ray's Candy Store and order milk shakes. The voice of proprietor Ray Alvarez can be heard taking their order through the window.

In the 1995 action film Die Hard with a Vengeance, the exterior of Ray's Candy Store was featured in a scene filmed in and around Tompkins Square Park.

Television
In July 2010, Ray was featured in a Fox News special hosted by John Stossel called "What's Great about America."

In November 2011, both an interior and exterior shot of Ray's Candy Store was featured in an episode of the HBO comedy-drama series How to Make It in America. The episode, titled "The Friction," was the seventh episode of the second season, and fifteenth overall in the series. In an interview, principal actor, Bryan Greenberg, who attended NYU as a student, made particular reference to the scene shot at Ray's Candy Store as a "full circle moment for me." In the scene, actors Greenberg and Victor Rasuk meet up for some frites to discuss brand business, while at their backs a "Save Ray's Candy Store" poster is in clear sight. They eventually walk outside onto Avenue A where the exterior hodgepodge of store signage receives its own cameo.

In 2014, Ray and the interior of Ray's Candy Store appeared in an episode of the Vice Media documentary web series Fuck, That's Delicious starring rapper, and former chef, Action Bronson.

In November 2018, Ray's Candy Store was featured in the series finale of CNN's travel and food show, Anthony Bourdain: Parts Unknown. The episode, titled "Lower East Side" – which brought Bourdain's culinary travelogue full circle back to his hometown of New York – aired November 11, 2018. In the scene, Bourdain and friend, musician Harley Flanagan, stop into Ray's Candy Store to chat up the proprietor and sample his famous eggs creams. Said Bourdain upon his first sip, "That is a superb egg cream."

Books
In the 1997 book New York Eats (More): The Food Shopper's Guide to the Freshest Ingredients, the Best Take-Out & Baked Goods, & the Most Unusual Marketplaces in All of New York by Ed Levine, Ray's Candy Store is highlighted in a section on the egg cream. The egg cream is also discussed in Abramovitch, Ilana; Galvin, Seán. Jews of Brooklyn. Brandeis series in American Jewish history, culture, and life (2002) by Ilana Abramovitch and Seán Galvin.

In 2015, Ray's Candy Store was featured in James and Karla Murray's book Store Front II: A History Preserved, a photographic chronicle of historical and storied businesses in New York City.

In 2018, Ray's Candy Store was mentioned in William B. Helmreich's book The Manhattan Nobody Knows: An Urban Walking Guide.

Music
The song "Lilly's Treat" by ska-punk band, Team Spider, off of their 2002 collaboration album with No Cash entitled "Summertime in the City" makes several references to Ray, Avenue A, and his famed egg creams.

In 2017, Ray and the interior and exterior of the store were featured in rock musician Jesse Malin's music video for "Meet Me at the End of the World."

Gallery

References

External links

 

Restaurants in Manhattan
Restaurants established in 1974
Confectionery stores
East Village, Manhattan